Rasmus Green (9 April 1980 – 12 June 2006) was a Danish professional footballer who played for Brøndby, AB, Ølstykke FC and Næstved BK. Green died on 12 June 2006 on the Næstved training pitch.

References

1980 births
2006 deaths
Danish men's footballers
Akademisk Boldklub players
Ølstykke FC players
Næstved Boldklub players
Association football midfielders
Association football players who died while playing
Accidental deaths in Denmark